McConnell's flycatcher (Mionectes macconnelli) is a species of bird in the tyrant flycatcher family Tyrannidae. It is found in the Guiana Shield, northern Brazil, Peru and Bolivia. Its natural habitats are subtropical or tropical moist lowland forests and subtropical or tropical moist montane forests.

McConnell's flycatcher was described by the English ornithologist Charles Chubb in 1919 as a subspecies of the ochre-bellied flycatcher. He coined the trinomial name Pipromorpha oleaginea macconnelli and specified the type location as the Kamakabra River in British Guiana. The name macconnelli was chosen to honour the memory of Frederick Vavasour McConnell (1868-1914), an English traveller and collector. It was treated as a separate species by the American ornithologist Clyde Todd in 1921, and was placed in the genus Mionectes by Melvin Traylor in Volume 8 of the Check-list of Birds of the World published in 1979. The species is monotypic.

This species was formerly considered conspecific with Sierra de Lema flycatcher (Mionectes roraimae). The two species have similar plumage but differ in their vocalisation and display behaviour.

References

Further reading

External links
Xeno-canto: audio recordings McConnell's flycatcher

McConnell's flycatcher
Birds of the Guianas
Birds of the Amazon Basin
McConnell's flycatcher
Taxonomy articles created by Polbot